Teach the Future is a youth-led campaign pushing for broad climate education in the UK, with specific branches in Scotland, England and Wales. It is formed by a volunteer base of students studying across England, Scotland and Wales at all levels of education - from secondary to tertiary - who believe that sustainability and climate change need to be taught across the curriculum, equipping generations to come with the skills and knowledge needed for the green jobs of the futures.

History 
The Teach the Future campaign began as a demand of the UK Student Climate Network and has been so since its formation in December 2018. From this, as it was a specialist area, the demand evolved into an individual campaign with the support of its parent organisations, Student Organising for Sustainability UK and UKSCN.

The campaign was unveiled on 12 October 2019 at National Education Union's Climate Emergency Conference, in front of a room full of educational specialists and campaigners. Two days after the campaign unveiling, Teach the Future began a petition and gathered 7413 signatories

In the lead up to the General Election of December 2019, Teach the Future launched a campaign to improve climate crisis education policy in political party manifestos. The outcome of this was the Labour Party including a curriculum review and the Green Party of England and Wales specifically mentioning Teach the Future's English Climate Emergency Education Act in both of their respective manifestos.

In accordance to their third ask, the student volunteers and a professional legislative draftsperson drafted the first ever student written education bill in history which has been supported by many Parliamentarians. Nadia Whittome supported the students in hosting a parliamentary reception to unveil this legislation to the Government by being their Parliamentary Sponsor; this reception was held in the Houses of Parliament's Terrace Pavilion on 26 February 2020 and had an attendance of over 150 politicians, educators, student campaigners, union representatives and supporters.

Asks 
Teach the Future calls for 3 main asks from the government, in addition to a fourth which is only relevant to the Scottish campaign

 A government-commissioned review into how the English/Scottish formal education system is preparing students for the climate emergency and ecological crisis
The inclusion of the climate emergency and ecological crisis in English/Scottish teaching standards and training
The enactment of an English Climate Emergency Education Bill - the first student written (draft) bill in history - and a Scottish Climate and Biodiversity Emergency Education Act
 All education providers to teach the truth about the climate and ecological emergency;
 Teachers and lecturers to be retrained to do so;
 Help for educators in supporting pupils suffering from eco-anxiety;
 Increased outdoor education for students;
 Funding for youth-led climate and environmental social action and youth voice;
 Creation of more green vocational training;
 Retrofitting of all educational buildings to net-zero emissions by 2030.
 For there to be an increased priority for sustainability in school inspections and publicly influencing educational rankings (Scotland only)

Structure 
Teach the Future is currently run by a team of 51 volunteers - spread across the nations of England and Scotland; in addition, the campaign employs 5 part-time student campaign coordinators, 1 seconded campaign manager from SOS-UK and 2 other SOS-UK staff members on small contract hours.

These volunteers organise through an online Slack workspace and aim to onboard new influxes of volunteers regularly.

Nations 
Despite Teach the Future being an umbrella organisation, encompassing volunteers from across the United Kingdom, it is composed of three separate branches. These operate in England, Scotland and Wales respectively. The Welsh branch, while being set up, has not officially launched yet, it is planned to be launched ahead of the 2021 Senedd election. All three campaigns are heavily intertwined as they run similar devolved projects (or projects that are relevant in every nation), as well as having a fluid methodology whereby volunteers are able to assist in any working group that interests them.

International influence 
The Teach the Future campaign aims to form an international network of climate education campaigns and has formed close ties with some, in the founding stages. Globally, it has made communication with multiple youth climate action groups, which has been facilitated through a staff member with the specific mandate of international outreach and support.

The UK-based campaign shares its name, however is not directly associated, with the Teach the Future Poland campaign – a branch of Strajk Klimatyczny (MSK).

Supporting organisations 
The Teach the Future campaign is supported and endorsed by multiple national organisations focussing on areas such as youth representation, conservation and education system reform. They are:

Key media 

 Joe Brindle in the Guardian
 Joe Brindle on BBC Radio 5 Live
 Joe Brindle in the Wilshire Herald & Gazette
 Mary Skuodas in an interview with the Word Forest Organisation
 Joe Brindle on BBC News
 Article on the TES website
 Anya Nanning Ramamurthy in Quaker News
 Featured in an article by The Conversation
 An article announcing support on the British Youth Council website
 Featured in an article by Caroline Lucas MP
 Joe Brindle on BBC Radio Wiltshire
 Nathan Widdowson in a blog by Stephen Morgan MP
 Featured in an article by The Student Room
 Mary Skuodas in an article by DeSmog
 Joe Brindle on BBC Radio 5 Live
 Joe Brindle in an interview with BBC Points West
 Featured in an article by Prospect Magazine
 Charlie Sweetman and Jess Nicholls in an interview with The Economist
 Charlie Sweetman and Karis McIntyre on BBC Radio Wiltshire
 Zamzam Ibrahim in an article by Japan Times
 Charlie Sweetman and Aurora McLaughlin-Gouldhacker in an article with the Thomas Reuters Foundation
 Scarlett Westbrook and Joe Brindle interviewing live on BBC Breakfast
 Olivia Marshall on BBC Radio Nottingham

References 

Climate change organisations based in the United Kingdom
Education reform
Environmental education in the United Kingdom
Environmental organisations based in the United Kingdom
Student organisations in the United Kingdom
Youth organisations based in the United Kingdom
Climate communication
Educational organisations based in the United Kingdom